The 40th Pennsylvania House of Representatives District is located in southwest Pennsylvania and has been represented since 2019 by Natalie Mihalek.

District profile
The 40th Pennsylvania House of Representatives District is located in Allegheny County and Washington County and includes the following areas:

Allegheny County
Bethel Park 
 Upper St. Clair Township (part)
Wards 03 (part)
Division 01 
Division 02
Ward 04 (part)
Divisions 02 
Division 03 
Division 04 
Ward 05
Washington County
 Peters Township

Representatives

Recent election results

References

External links
District map from the United States Census Bureau
Pennsylvania House Legislative District Maps from the Pennsylvania Redistricting Commission.  
Population Data for District 40 from the Pennsylvania Redistricting Commission.

Government of Allegheny County, Pennsylvania
Government of Washington County, Pennsylvania
40
1969 establishments in Pennsylvania